"Please" is a song recorded by American country music artist Pam Tillis.  It was released in December 2000 as the first single from the album Thunder & Roses.  The song reached #22 on the Billboard Hot Country Singles & Tracks chart.  The song was written by Jeffrey Steele, Michael Dulaney and John Hobbs.

Chart performance

References

2001 singles
2000 songs
Pam Tillis songs
Songs written by Michael Dulaney
Songs written by Jeffrey Steele
Song recordings produced by Billy Joe Walker Jr.
Arista Nashville singles